Tim Danneberg (born 23 April 1986) is a German retired footballer who played as a midfielder.

Career
Born in Minden, Danneberg started his professional career spending two seasons in the Bundesliga with Arminia Bielefeld, before joining Eintracht Braunschweig. After three years in Braunschweig Danneberg transferred to SV Sandhausen, and, in 2012, was promoted to the 2. Bundesliga with the club.

At the end of the 2018-19 season, Danneberg retired but continued at VfL Osnabrück as an assistant manager. He was appointed as the interim manager on 18 August 2022.

References

External links

1986 births
Living people
People from Minden
Sportspeople from Detmold (region)
Footballers from North Rhine-Westphalia
German footballers
Association football midfielders
Arminia Bielefeld players
Eintracht Braunschweig players
SV Sandhausen players
Holstein Kiel players
Chemnitzer FC players
VfL Osnabrück players
Bundesliga players
2. Bundesliga players
3. Liga players
VfL Osnabrück managers
3. Liga managers